Jill Glosemeyer (born November 12, 1974) is an American former soccer player who played as a defender, making two appearances for the United States women's national team.

Career
Stewart played for the Apple Valley Eagles in high school, before joining the Wisconsin Badgers in college, where she played from 1993 to 1996 and recorded 23 assists. She was an NSCAA Second-Team All-American in 1996, and was included in the NSCAA All-Region First Team in 1994, 1995, and 1996. She was also included in the All-Big Ten Conference First Team in 1994 and 1996 and Second Team in 1995, and was honored as a Academic All-Big Ten in 1996. In 1997 she was included in the west squad for the Umbro Select College All-Star Soccer Classic.

Stewart made her international debut for the United States on October 9, 1997 in a friendly match against Germany. She earned her second and final cap on October 30, 1997 in a friendly match against Sweden.

She later served as an assistant coach Apple Valley Eagles girls' soccer team in 2011.

Career statistics

International

External links
 Share Your Story from Big Ten Conference

References

External links
 UW Badgers player profile

1974 births
Living people
People from Apple Valley, Minnesota
Soccer players from Minnesota
American women's soccer players
American women's soccer coaches
United States women's international soccer players
Women's association football defenders
Wisconsin Badgers women's soccer players
Apple Valley High School (Minnesota) alumni